Metropolitan Theodosius (secular name Frank Lazor; , Canonsburg, Pennsylvania) was the primate of the Orthodox Church in America (OCA) from 1977 until his retirement in 2002. On , Metropolitan Theodosius (who had suffered a series of strokes) submitted a petition to the Holy Synod of the OCA, requesting his retirement. He was succeeded by Metropolitan Herman (Swaiko).

On , Theodosius died following an "extended illness" in his hometown of Canonsburg just 8 days shy of his 87th birthday.

Notes and references

1933 births
2020 deaths
20th-century American clergy
20th-century Eastern Orthodox archbishops
21st-century American clergy
21st-century Eastern Orthodox archbishops
People from Canonsburg, Pennsylvania
Primates of the Orthodox Church in America
Religious leaders from Pennsylvania